Kittikun Jamsuwan (born June 9, 1984) is a Thai professional footballer who plays as a goalkeeper for Thai League 2 club Nongbua Pitchaya.

Club career

Honours

Club
Buriram United 
 Thai Premier League (1): 2011 
 Thai FA Cup (2): 2011, 2012 
 Thai League Cup (2): 2011, 2012
Nongbua Pitchaya
 Thai League 2 (1): 2020–21

References

External links

1984 births
Living people
Kittikun Jamsuwan
Kittikun Jamsuwan
Association football goalkeepers
Kittikun Jamsuwan
Kittikun Jamsuwan
Kittikun Jamsuwan
Kittikun Jamsuwan
Kittikun Jamsuwan
Kittikun Jamsuwan
Kittikun Jamsuwan